is a former Japanese football player. He played for Japan national team.

Club career
Saeki was born in Hiroshima Prefecture on May 26, 1936. After graduating from high school, he joined Yawata Steel. In 1965, Yawata Steel joined new league Japan Soccer League. He retired in 1966. He played 22 games and scored 9 goals in the league.

National team career
On December 25, 1958, he debuted for Japan national team against Hong Kong. He played 4 games for Japan until 1961.

National team statistics

References

External links
 
 Japan National Football Team Database

1936 births
Living people
Association football people from Hiroshima Prefecture
Japanese footballers
Japan international footballers
Japan Soccer League players
Nippon Steel Yawata SC players
Association football forwards